Porz-Wahn is a railway station situated at Porz, Cologne in the German state of North Rhine-Westphalia on the Sieg and East Rhine Railways. It is served by the S12 and S13 lines of the Rhine-Ruhr S-Bahn. Both lines operate towards Cologne at 20-minute intervals, so together they provide a 10-minute interval S-Bahn service to Cologne. It is also served by the S19 service between Düren and Au (Sieg), running hourly and substituting for one of the S13 services. It is classified by Deutsche Bahn as a category 4 station.

References 

S12 (Rhine-Ruhr S-Bahn)
S13 (Rhine-Ruhr S-Bahn)
Railway stations in Cologne
Rhine-Ruhr S-Bahn stations
Porz
Railway stations in Germany opened in 1859
1859 establishments in Prussia

de:Köln-Wahn#Verkehr